Jason W. Chung , better known as Nosaj Thing, is an American artist, record producer, and DJ based in Los Angeles, California. He has produced tracks for Kendrick Lamar, Chance the Rapper, Kid Cudi, Julianna Barwick, and is the founder of Timetable Records.

Biography
Born in Los Angeles, California. He is of Korean descent. At the age of 12, he began to make music using computers.

He self-released the debut EP, Views/Octopus, in 2006. His first studio album, Drift, was released on Alpha Pup Records in 2009. A remix version of the album, titled Drift Remixed, was released in 2010. In 2012, he released a single, "Eclipse/Blue", which featured vocalist Kazu Makino. His second studio album, Home, was released in 2013. His third studio album, Fated, was released in 2015. In 2016, he released an EP, No Reality. His fourth studio album, Parallels, was released in 2017.

Career

Views/Octopus
His earliest performances were at Los Angeles' DIY avant-garde music venue The Smell and experimental hip hop club night Low End Theory where he became part of a community of beat makers including Samiyam and Flying Lotus. He went on to self-release the debut EP, Views/Octopus, in 2006 featuring beats made throughout this early period.

Drift
His first studio album, Drift, was released on Alpha Pup Records in 2009. A remix version of the album, titled Drift Remixed, was released in 2010.

Subsequent Releases
Between 2012 and 2017 Thing released a further three full length studio albums, and EP and a Single. In 2013 he founded record label Timetable Records featuring artists such as  D Tiberio, Holodec, Gerry Read, Whoarei, 4THSEX and Daito Manabe on the roster.

In 2020 Thing announced he had signed to LuckyMe Records, releasing EP No Mind  and single "For The Light" with accompanying music video

Live
Throughout 2009 and 2010 he toured a live audiovisual show, featuring large scale video projections of live manipulated graphics, with showcase performances at Sónar Festival, Pop Montreal and São Paulo Museum of Image and Sound. 

In 2016 Thing collaborated with Japanese artist Daito Manabe to create a touring show featuring real-time augmented reality visuals using multiple Kinect cameras on stage. The debut performance at Coachella Festival was described by Pitchfork Magazine as "runaway winner for best visual production" and was billed by Sónar Festival as "extremely captivating, technologically advanced, show of inordinate beauty".

Discography

Studio albums
 Drift (2009)
 Home (2013)
 Fated (2015) 
 Parallels (2017)
 Continua (2022)

Remix albums
 Drift Remixed (2010)

EPs
 Views/Octopus (2006)
 No Reality (2016)
No Mind (2020)

Singles
 "Night Crawler" (2010)
 "Eclipse/Blue" featuring Kazu Makino (2012)
 "For the Light" (2020)

Productions
 Kid Cudi – "Man on the Moon (The Anthem)" from A Kid Named Cudi (2008) and Man on the Moon: The End of Day (2009)
 Busdriver – "Split Seconds (Between Nannies and Swamis)" from Jhelli Beam (2009)
 Nocando – "Head Static" from Jimmy the Lock (2010)
 Flash Bang Grenada – "Beat My B*tch" from 10 Haters (2011)
 Kendrick Lamar – "Cloud 10" (2011)
 Chance the Rapper – "Paranoia" from Acid Rap (2013)
 KUČKA – "Real" from Wrestling (2019)
 Park Hye Jin – "Clouds" (2020)
 Kid Cudi  – "Another Day" from Man on the Moon III: The Chosen (2020)
 Jamie Isaac – 3 (2020)
 Julianna Barwick – "Nod" from Healing Is a Miracle (2020)

References

External links
 
 

Living people
1985 births
American musicians of Korean descent
American electronic musicians
Musicians from Los Angeles
People from Montebello, California